This list of Nepenthes species is a comprehensive listing of all known species of the carnivorous plant genus Nepenthes. It includes 179 recognised extant species, 2 incompletely diagnosed taxa, and 3 nothospecies. Three possible extinct species are also covered.

The official IUCN conservation status of each species is taken from the latest edition of the IUCN Red List. Unofficial assessments based on the IUCN criteria are also included, but are presented in italics. Unless otherwise noted, taxonomic determinations and all other information are sourced from Stewart McPherson's two-volume Pitcher Plants of the Old World, published in 2009. Where recent literature provides an altitudinal distribution that falls outside the range given in Pitcher Plants of the Old World, the discrepancy is noted.

All major islands within a species's geographic range are included. Smaller surrounding islands are listed separately under "Minor islands", though these lists are not exhaustive. In the case of archipelagos such as the Philippines, the individual islands to which the species is native are shown in brackets.

Authorities are presented in the form of a standard author citation, using abbreviations specified by the International Plant Names Index. Years given denote the year of the species's formal publication under the current name, thus excluding the earlier basionym date of publication if one exists.

Extant species

Incompletely diagnosed taxa
The following undescribed taxa are taken from Pitcher Plants of the Old World and its supplementary volume, New Nepenthes, published in 2011.

Nothospecies
Matthew Jebb and Martin Cheek recognised the following three nothospecies in their monographs on the genus ("A skeletal revision of Nepenthes (Nepenthaceae)" (1997) and "Nepenthaceae" (2001)). In the recent literature, these taxa have generally been treated as natural hybrids rather than as species. Of the three, N. × kinabaluensis has the strongest claim to species status, as it grows in two large, self-sustaining populations independent of its putative parent species. These populations are reportedly true breeding. Jumaat Haji Adam and C. C. Wilcock advocated the recognition of N. × kinabaluensis as a species in a 1998 article.

Extinct species
Fossil pollen of various provenance, much of it originally described under the form taxon Droseridites, has been tentatively assigned to Nepenthes by several authors. The following three species were transferred to the genus Nepenthes by Wilfried Krutzsch in 1985.

Some authors consider Droseridites major and D. parvus as synonyms of Nepenthidites laitryngewensis.

Pollen from the Kerguelen Islands originally described as D. spinosus has also been interpreted as belonging to Nepenthes.

See also
 List of Nepenthes species by distribution
 List of Nepenthes natural hybrids

Notes

References

02
Nepenthes02
Nepenthes02
Nepenthes Species List02